The Royal Navy of Oman, abbreviated RNO, is the maritime component of the Royal Armed Forces of the Sultanate of Oman. Given its long coastline and strategic location along the Indian Ocean, as well as being close to the Strait of Hormuz, the Royal Navy is one of the priorities of the government of Oman. It has a fleet of gunboats, fast missile boats and support, training, cargo and hydro-graphical survey vessels, which can be deployed to defend the territorial waters and coastline of Oman as well as protect tankers passing through the Strait of Hormuz. The Royal Navy's headquarters are in Seeb, near the Muscat International Airport. A modernization program is ongoing, with the objective of creating a first rate fleet.Similarly, the Royal Oman Police's fleet, which operates smaller range boats and patrol crafts, is being updated due to raising tensions in the region.

The origin of the Royal Navy of Oman is traceable to the reign of Imam Ghassan bin Abdullah (807–824 CE). He was the first ruler of Oman to possess a Navy, with a standing royal navy of Oman being formally established in 1650.

History
The origin of the Royal Navy of Oman can be traced to the reign of Imam Ghassan bin Abdullah (807–824 CE). He was the first ruler of Oman to possess a Navy.  He commissioned ships in order to fend off pirates operating along the western shores of the Indian Ocean who were conducting raids along the coast of the Arabian Peninsula.

The Omani Navy dominated the Western Indian Ocean for many years thereafter until the arrival of the Portuguese that changed the balance of sea power in the region. Beginning in 1508 with the invasion of Oman by the Portuguese the conflict came to end in 1515 with the loss of Oman’s maritime trade routes.

Beginning in 1624, Oman started to recover its lost naval ports under Imam ‘s Nasir bin Murshid (1624–1649), and Sultan bin Saif (1649–1688) the objective of the Omani navy's role was force out the Portuguese from their bases in Oman that was achieved by 1650.

The Royal Oman Navy fell into another period of neglect until the reign of Ahmed bin Said. (1749–1783). He began to rebuild the Omani Navy and had commissioned a fleet of four ships, that were equipped with 40 guns, additionally, he had 25 coastal boats built. A stronger navy was rebuilt between the seventeenth and nineteenth centuries. Its main purpose was to then protect Oman’s overseas territories.

During the reign of Sultan Said bin Sultan (1806–1856) the navy grew larger. The Sultan had sent several Royal Omani Navy ships on specific commercial and diplomatic visits, first to New York in 1840 the Al Sultanah transported Ahmed bin Al-Noman Al-Ka’abi who was the first Arab envoy sent to the United States.

From 1862, the Sultanate of Oman lapsed again into a period of steady decline due to internal political wrangling’s and along with it the Royal Oman Navy. In 1888 Oman became a protectorate of the British Empire, which it would remain for almost 100 years. In 1962, the Dhofar Rebellion erupted, pitting communist insurgents against the Omani government. Although small, the Omani Navy  undertook an important role in this conflict by providing naval gunfire support and bombarding insurgent positions inland.

During the late 1960s, the Royal Oman Navy existed as the naval branch of the Sultan’s Armed Forces (SAF) instead of as a separate standing navy. In 1971 the British Protectorate of Oman came to an end, and following the discovery of oil fields leading to the sale of oil abroad, that provided much-needed investment in modernizing the navy and growing the existing fleet.

The main naval base moved from Sultan Bin Ahmed Naval Base in Muscat to Said bin Sultan Naval Base in Wudam Al Sahil, near Al-Musannah, which opened in 1988. One of the largest engineering projects in Oman, it serves as a homeport for the fleet and includes training facilities as well as repair bays. The Sultan Qaboos Naval academy, located at the base, provided instruction for officers and enlisted personnel, as well as specific branch training. Originally, most of the officers were British, with non-commissioned officers being mostly Pakistani. However, by 1980, most of the officers were Omani, though British and Pakistani technicians remained.
In 1992, the Royal Oman Navy had a strength of 3,000 personnel. 

The Royal Oman Navy does not have a marine corps or any naval infantry formations, though it has multiple amphibious warfare ships. A modernization program is ongoing in order to protect the coastline as well as the strategically important Strait of Hormuz. The British Royal Navy, in 2011, helped train corvette crews with its Flag Officer Sea Training.

Ships

Missiles
 50 VT-1 Crotale NG SAMs
 162 Exocet MM-40 (122 Block-1+ 40 Block-2)
 Exocet MM-38
 Harpoon Block-II
 VL Mica-SAM

Electronics
 MASS Ship protection system
 3 x SMART-S MK-II Ship sensors
 2 x MW-8 Air search radar
 5 x Sting fire control radar
 2 x DRBV-51C fire control radar
 3 x RA-20S air search radar
 4 x 9LV radar
 3 x CEROS-200 radar

Future

Procurement

New Research Vessel
The Royal Navy of Oman (RNO) has contracted with the US Pentagon through a Foreign Military Sales (FMS) program to provide a new research vessel based on the RV F.G. Walton Smith, a University of Miami vessel. DeJong & Lebet, Naval Architects, provided the US Navy with Contract Drawings and Engineering.

Thoma-Sea Shipbuilders of Lockport, Louisiana reportedly won a $7.3m contract to build a Catamaran Hull Hydrographic Survey Vessel for the government of Oman, according to a report. This vessel will be built by Thoma-Sea. Thoma-Sea’s partner in this proposal is Technology Associates Inc. (TAI) of New Orleans in Louisiana. TAI prepared the proposal for Thoma-Sea and will be in charge of performing the Design, Program Management and Integrated Logistics Support (ILS) functions for Thoma-Sea.  The Sultanate of Oman will receive this 90-foot vessel, which is designed to conduct hydrographic and environmental surveys of harbors and bays, and will work in Oman’s territorial waters, according to the release.

Oman has also issued RFI for a new ‘hydrographic survey vessel’. US Naval Sea Systems Command is promoting ship design based on the Walton Smith Catamaran design.

In Oman, South Korean defence minister Song Young-moo met with his counterpart Sayyid Badr bin Saud bin Harib Al Busaidi. They spoke highly about the South Korean destroyers, Oman signed a deal in 2018 for an unknown number of ships and other arms including tanks.

South Korean Navy to receive refurbished KDX-I destroyer Eulji Mundeok.

Former ships
 Four Brooke Marine patrol craft

See also

 Qahir Al Amwaj

References

 
Military units and formations established in the 1950s
Military of Oman
Navies by country